{{Infobox college softball team
|name = Boston College Eagles
|CurrentSeason = 
|logo = Boston College Eagles wordmark.svg
|logo_size = 250
|university = Boston College
|conference = Atlantic Coast Conference
|conference_short = ACC
|division = Atlantic
|city = Chestnut Hill
|stateabb = MA
|state = Massachusetts
|coach =  Amy Kvilhaug
|tenure = 1st
|stadium = Boston College Softball Field
|capacity = 1,000
|nickname = Eagles
|national_champion = 
|wcws = 
|ncaa_tourneys = 1997, 1998, 2003
|conference_tournament = 
Big East1997, 1998

ACC
|conference_champion = 
}}Boston College Eagles Softball''' is in the Atlantic Coast Conference and is a Division I program. Their mascot is an American eagle.

Coaching staff

See also
List of NCAA Division I softball programs

References